Alosa caspia is a species of clupeid fish, one of the species of shad (genus Alosa) endemic to the Caspian Sea basin.

FishBase treats separately three subspecies from the Caspian:

 Caspian shad, Alosa caspia caspia (Eichwald, 1838)
  Enzeli shad, Alosa caspia knipowitschi (Iljin, 1927)
 Astrabad shad, Alosa caspia persica (Iljin, 1927)

Previously the taxonomic circumscription and geographic range of A. caspia have been broader, encompassing also the Sea of Azov and Black Sea basins. Up to ten subspecies were recognised; these included forms now classified as Alosa tanaica (and its synonyms) and even the Balkan freshwater endemics Alosa macedonica and Alosa vistonica.

References

caspia
Fish of the Caspian Sea
Freshwater fish of Asia
Freshwater fish of Europe
Least concern biota of Asia
Least concern biota of Europe
Taxa named by Karl Eichwald
Fish described in 1838